The 1966 Buffalo Bills season was the team’s seventh season in the American Football League. It was the first season for head coach Joe Collier, who had been the Bills' defensive coordinator for the previous four seasons.

It ended with a loss in the AFL Championship Game to the Kansas City Chiefs, ending the team's two-year reign as league champions. The score was 31-7 during the time.

The Bills allowed the fewest points in the AFL for the third consecutive year. Although defensive tackle Tom Sestak hampered by a bad knee, defensive linemen Jim Dunaway and Ron McDole took a leadership position. Linebackers Mike Stratton, Harry Jacobs and John Tracey, and defensive backs George Saimes, Butch Byrd, Hagood Clarke and Tom Janik provided a strong defensive foundation.

Halfback Bobby Burnett and split end Bobby Crockett joined long-time Bills running back Wray Carlton and quarterback Jack Kemp, leading Buffalo's offense to scoring 358 points, second-most in the AFL in 1966. Burnett's 1,185 total yards from scrimmage were 5th in the AFL, and garnered AFL Rookie of the Year honors for Burnett.

Personnel

Staff

Final roster

Offseason
Lou Saban, who had coached the Bills to consecutive AFL Championships, left the team after the 1965 season to coach at the University of Maryland.

AFL draft

Regular season

Season schedule

Note:
 Intra-division opponents are in bold text.

Standings

Game summaries

Week 1

Week 2

Week 3

Week 10

Roster

Postseason

AFL Championship Game

Kansas City Chiefs 31, Buffalo Bills 7
January 1, 1967, at War Memorial Stadium, Buffalo, New YorkAttendance: 42,080

The Bills entered the AFL championship game seeking their third consecutive title.  Though the game was played in Buffalo, the visiting Kansas City Chiefs were three-point favorites, mainly because of their explosive and innovative offense led by head coach Hank Stram.  The Bills were a more conventional team with a solid defensive line and a running mindset on offense.

Buffalo found no offensive rhythm in the second half, and the Chiefs closed the game out in the fourth quarter with Dawson found Chris Burford for a 45-yard gain, setting up a one-foot touchdown run by rookie Mike Garrett. Less than two minutes later, Garrett scored a second touchdown following another Bills fumble.

Scoring
 KC – Arbanas 29 pass from Dawson (Mercer kick)
 BUF – Dubenion 69 pass from Kemp (Lusteg kick)
 KC – Taylor 29 pass from Dawson (Mercer kick)
 KC – Field goal Mercer 32
 KC – Garrett 1 run (Mercer kick)
 KC – Garrett 18 run (Mercer kick)

Awards and Records
 Bobby Burnett, Rookie of the Year

References

 Buffalo Bills on Pro Football Reference
 Buffalo Bills on jt-sw.com

Buffalo Bills
Buffalo Bills seasons
1966 in sports in New York (state)